Ferocious Brothers is a 1972 Hong Kong film.

References

External links

1972 films
Hong Kong action films
1972 action films
1970s Mandarin-language films
1970s Hong Kong films